"" ("Anthem of the Basque Race"), also known as "" ("Anthem of the Basque Country"), is the official anthem of the Basque Country in northern Spain. The lyrics were written by Basque nationalist writer Sabino Arana, and its melody is based on an old Basque tune. The anthem was originally used for the Basque Nationalist Party (BNP/PNV), and it was adopted by the first Basque Government in the 1930s. Its re-proclamation by the Basque Parliament on 14 April 1983 was opposed by several parties that deemed it still to be bound to the PNV rather than to the rest of the Basques.

Like the national anthem of Spain, "Marcha Real", the lyrics are not officially sung. The law makes official the music with no lyrics, since opposition parties felt the Arana text too religious and linked to the BNP.

Unofficial lyrics

See also
 Anthems of the autonomous communities of Spain

Notes

References

External links
Symbols of the Basque Country: The Official Basque Anthem, at the Basque Government site (Spanish).

Spanish anthems
Regional songs
Basque culture
Anthems of non-sovereign states